Class 804 may refer to:

British Rail Class 804, the original anticipated classification for what would later become the British Rail Class 810
ICE 1 restaurant cars